The Cyclone is a 1996 Italian romantic comedy film, co-written, directed by and starred by Leonardo Pieraccioni.

Plot
Tuscany, June 1996. Levante Quarini (Leonardo Pieraccioni) is a young accountant of Tuscany who lives his unhappy relationship with women. He lives with his father Osvaldo (Sergio Forconi), his brother Libero (Massimo Ceccherini) and his lesbian sister Selvaggia (Barbara Enrichi) on a lonely residence surrounded by corn fields.
They are far from the major roads and signs are far and scarce, but that is not a problem since the dirt roads are used usually only by the locals who know them well.

On an apparent everyday evening a sign pointing to a nearby agritourism fell and a bus with a group of flamenco dancers due to town for a recital, get lost. They can't find their way to the agritourism and their lazy manager had forgot to confirm reservations so their rooms aren't available anymore anyway.

They have no chance but to stop at the Quarini residence to spend the night, and the story unfolds from here...

Cast
Leonardo Pieraccioni as Levante Quarini
Lorena Forteza as Caterina
Barbara Enrichi as Selvaggia Quarini
Massimo Ceccherini as Libero Quarini
Sergio Forconi as Osvaldo Quarini
Tosca D'Aquino as Carlina
Patrizia Corti as Franca Beniamini
Benedetta Mazzini as Isabella
Natalia Estrada as Penelope
Paolo Hendel as Pippo
Alessandro Haber as Naldone

Reception
Il Ciclone fared very well at the box office and was nominated for several awards, including seven David di Donatello, one of the most important Italian cinematic awards. The film won in the categories of "Audience Award", "Best Supporting Actress" (for Barbara Enrichi) and "Scholars Jury David". It was also nominated for "Best Film", "Best Screenplay", "Best Actor" (for Pieraccioni) and "Best Supporting Actor" (for Massimo Ceccherini), but lost it. The film was also nominated for four Ciak d'oro, winning two and losing two, and also won one "Globo Dorado" (for "Best Actor), one Hamptons International Film Festival Award (for "Most Popular Feature") and two Nastro d'Argento (for "Best Screenplay" and "Best Actor").

It grossed $442,283 in its opening weekend from 43 screens and placing fifth at the Italian box office. The film went on to become the highest-grossing Italian film of all-time with a gross of $44 million.

References

External links
 

Films directed by Leonardo Pieraccioni
Films set in Tuscany
Italian romantic comedy films
1996 films
1996 romantic comedy films
1990s Italian-language films
1990s Italian films